College Greens is a side platformed Sacramento RT light rail station in the College Greens neighborhood of Sacramento, California, United States. The station was opened on September 5, 1987, and is operated by the Sacramento Regional Transit District. It is served by the Gold Line. The station is located near the intersection of Florin Perkins Road and Folsom Boulevard, in an area dominated by student housing.

Platforms and tracks

References

Sacramento Regional Transit light rail stations
Railway stations in the United States opened in 1987